Southeast Europe or Southeastern Europe (SEE) is a geographical subregion of Europe, consisting primarily of the Balkans, as well as adjacent regions and archipelagos. Sovereign states and territories that are included in the region are Albania, Bosnia and Herzegovina, Bulgaria, Croatia (alternatively placed in Central Europe), Cyprus (alternatively placed in West Asia), Greece (alternatively placed in the broader region of Southern Europe), Kosovo, Montenegro, North Macedonia, Romania (alternatively placed in Central Europe), Serbia, and the European part of Turkey (alternatively placed in the broader region of Southern Europe, also in West Asia with the rest of the country). Sometimes, Moldova (alternatively placed in Eastern Europe) and Slovenia (alternatively placed in Central Europe) are also included. The largest cities of the region are Istanbul, Athens, Bucharest, Sofia, and Belgrade.

There are overlapping and conflicting definitions of the region, due to political, economic, historical, cultural, and geographical considerations.

Definition
The first known use of the term "Southeast Europe" was by Austrian researcher Johann Georg von Hahn (1811–1869) as a broader term than the traditional Balkans, a concept based on the boundaries of the Balkan Peninsula (the countries that have been described as being entirely within the Balkan region are: Albania, Kosovo, Bosnia and Herzegovina, Bulgaria, Montenegro, and North Macedonia).

Geographical Southeast Europe
Countries that are geographically, at least partially, described to be within the region are as follows:

Albania
Bosnia and Herzegovina
Bulgaria
Croatia
Cyprus
Greece
Kosovo
Moldova
Montenegro
North Macedonia
Romania
Serbia
Slovenia
Turkey (East Thrace)

CIA World Factbook

In the CIA World Factbook, the description of each country includes information about "Location" under the heading "Geography", where the country is classified into a region. The following countries are included in their classification "Southeast Europe":

 Albania
 Bosnia and Herzegovina
 Bulgaria
 Croatia
 Kosovo
 Montenegro
 North Macedonia
 Romania
 Serbia
 Turkey (East Thrace)

In this classification, Slovenia is included in Central Europe, Greece in Southern Europe, and Moldova in Eastern Europe.

Notable views
The Stability Pact for South Eastern Europe (SPSEE) included Albania, Bosnia and Herzegovina, Bulgaria, Croatia, Kosovo, Moldova, Montenegro, North Macedonia, Romania and Serbia as member partners.
The South-East European Cooperation Process (SEECP) includes Albania, Bosnia and Herzegovina, Bulgaria, Croatia, Greece, Kosovo, Moldova, Montenegro, North Macedonia, Romania, Serbia, Slovenia and Turkey as member partners.
The Southeast European Cooperative Initiative (SECI) includes Albania, Bosnia and Herzegovina, Bulgaria, Croatia, Greece, Hungary, Moldova, Montenegro, North Macedonia, Romania, Serbia, Slovenia and Turkey as member partners.
The EU-co-funded South East Europe Transnational Cooperation Programme includes the whole territory of Albania, Austria, Bosnia and Herzegovina, Bulgaria, Croatia, Greece, Hungary, North Macedonia, Montenegro, Moldova, Romania, Serbia, Slovakia, Slovenia, and parts of Italy and Ukraine as part of the "programme area".
Studies of the World Bank treat Albania, Bosnia and Herzegovina, Bulgaria, Croatia, Moldova, North Macedonia, Romania and Serbia as the eight South Eastern European countries (SEE8).
A 2006 publication of the World Health Organization (WHO) and Council of Europe Development Bank (CEB) listed Albania, Bosnia and Herzegovina, Bulgaria, Croatia, North Macedonia, Moldova, Romania and Serbia and Montenegro as 'south-eastern European countries'.
The World Bank does not include the EU countries in its reports, and lists only Albania, Bosnia and Herzegovina, Kosovo, Montenegro, North Macedonia, and Serbia (SEE6).
UNHCR's Regional Office in South Eastern Europe currently lists Albania, Bosnia and Herzegovina, North Macedonia and Montenegro as part of 'South Eastern Europe'.

See also

 Eurovoc
 Organization of the Black Sea Economic Cooperation
 Percentages agreement
 Regional Cooperation Council
 Southeast European Times
 South East Europe Media Organisation
 Southeast Europe Transport Community

Notes

References

Sources
 Paul L. Horecky (ed.), Southeastern Europe: A guide to basic publications, Chicago: The University of Chicago Press, 1969.
 
 
 Troebst, Stefan, "Historical Meso-Region": A Concept in Cultural Studies and Historiography, EGO - European History Online, Mainz: Institute of European History, 2012, retrieved: 4 March 2020 (pdf)

Further reading
 
 Koller, Markus, Ottoman History of South-East Europe, EGO - European History Online, Mainz: Institute of European History, 2012, retrieved: 17 March 2021 (pdf).

External links
 

 
Regions of Europe
Eastern Europe
Southern Europe